Bitis arietans somalica (Somali: Abeeso) also known as the Somali puff adder, is a venomous viper subspecies found only in Somalia, Somaliland, eastern Ethiopia, and northern Kenya. It is distinguished from B. a. arietans by its keeled subcaudals.

Normally, B. arietans grows to a total length (body and tail) around 800–900 mm (about 32-36 in).

Geographic range
This snake is found in northeastern Kenya, eastern Ethiopia, Somalia (including Coiama Island), and Somaliland. The type locality given is "Bohodle, 2100 ft., Somaliland" (Bohodle, 640 m, Somaliland).

References

Further reading
Parker HW. 1949. The Snakes of Somaliland and the Sokotra Islands. Zoologische Verhandelingen 6: 1-115. ("Bitis lachesis somalica subsp. nov.", pp. 101–105 + figure.)

External links

 

arietans somalica
Reptiles of Somalia
Taxa named by Hampton Wildman Parker